Riho Terras (1939–2005) was an Estonian-American mathematician. He was born in Tartu, Estonia and moved to Ulm, Germany before starting school. In 1951 he migrated to United States along with his mother. In 1965, he was given the Milton Abramowitz award for his studies at the University of Maryland. He finished his PhD in 1970 at the University of Illinois Urbana-Champaign.

He is known for the Terras theorem about the Collatz conjecture, published in 1976, which proved that the conjecture holds for "almost all" numbers and established bounds for the conjecture.

He married fellow mathematician Audrey Terras.

References 

Estonian emigrants to the United States
1939 births
2005 deaths
Estonian mathematicians
20th-century Estonian scientists
20th-century American mathematicians
University of Maryland, College Park alumni
University of Illinois Urbana-Champaign alumni